Bahamut is the debut album by American blues/folk/world music/jazz band Hazmat Modine. The album was released on August 26, 2006 by Barbès Records. Most tracks were composed by lead singer Wade Schuman; the album also includes arrangements of traditional songs. Tuvan folk band Huun-Huur-Tu feature on three tracks with their characteristic throat singing.

Track listing

Personnel
Hazmat Modine
Henry Bogdan: Hawaiian guitar
Josh Camp: Claviola
Joseph Daley: Tuba
Steve Elson: Baritone saxophone
Alexander Fedoriouk: Cimbalom
Michael Gomez: Guitar
Daniel Hovey: Guitar
Richard Huntley: Drums
Wade Schuman: Guitar, harmonica, lute, vocals
Jon Sholle: Guitar
Pete Smith: Guitar
Scott Veenstra: Drums
Randy Weinstein: Guitar, vocals

Huun-Huur-Tu
Sayan Bapa
Anatoli Kuular

Reception
Bahamut peaked at #12 on Billboard's "Top Blues Albums" chart.

Reviewing the album for Allmusic, Jeff Tamarkin gave it four stars out of a possible five, and termed it a "stunning debut". Tamarkin praised the band for successfully fusing styles as disparate as blues, jazz, klezmer, calypso, and ska into "music that sounds at once ageless and primeval, authentically indigenous and inexplicably otherworldly, familiar and unlike anything else." He also praised the group for making "listener-friendly music" that doesn't "require a degree in ethnomusicology to enjoy".

Pitchfork Media reviewer Joe Tangari gave the album's track "Everybody Loves You," a collaboration with Tuvan throat singers Huun-Huur-Tu, a four-star review. Characterizing it as "generalized roots music that takes from pretty much any roots it sees fit," he praised it as "true world music, weird and wonderful to the last note."

References

External links

2006 debut albums
Hazmat Modine albums